A chip (American English and Australian English) or crisp (British English) is a snack food in the form of a crisp, flat or slightly bowl shaped, bite-sized unit. Some chips can be made into dishes and served as an appetizer, side, hors d'oeuvre, etc.

Some types of chip are often served in the combination plate, chips and dip. Other chips are sweet or strongly flavored or fragile. Tortilla chips can be used for chips and salsa, nachoes, bean dip, guacamole, or a layered dip containing multiple of these.

Popular kinds of chip

Root chips 

 Potato chips, a thin slice of potato that has been deep fried or baked until crunchy
 Tapioca chips, a snack food made from thin wafers of deep fried cassava root

Grain and bean chips 
Bean chips, chips prepared using beans as a primary ingredient
Corn chips, a snack food made from cornmeal fried in oil or baked
Pita chips, chips made of dried pita
Tortilla chips, a snack food made from corn tortillas

Fruit chips (sweet chips) 
Banana chips, slices of banana that are fried or dried
Plantain chips, a snack made with sliced plantains

Vegetable chips 

Carrot chips, a common term for carrots that have been fried or dehydrated
Kale chips, snack food made of baked kale

See also 

 
 
 
 
 {{Jolo chips}} - Jolo Chips is a very hot and spicy food because it is made with the world's hottest spices.
Snack foods